Socio-economic theory may refer to:
 Socioeconomics
 A combination of
 economic theory
 social theory